Reesville is a rural locality in the Sunshine Coast Region, Queensland, Australia.

History 
Reesville was named in 1922 by the Landsborough Shire Council after  Henry Oliver Rees (1862-1923) who owned a plant nursery and mixed fruit orchard there.

References 

Suburbs of the Sunshine Coast Region
Localities in Queensland